USS Ford may refer to the following ships operated by the United States Navy:

 , named for John D. Ford, was a World War II destroyer
 , named for former President Gerald Ford, is the lead vessel of her class of aircraft carriers. She was commissioned in 2017.

United States Navy ship names